The April 2016 North American storm complex was a major storm system that resulted from an upper-level low in the United States stalling and producing record-breaking rain in and around Houston, Texas, resulting in severe flooding, as well as a major snowstorm in the Rocky Mountains.  There were more than 17 inches of rain in one day in parts of the city, and up to 4 inches of rain per hour that morning at George Bush Intercontinental Airport.  It is described as the wettest April in the city on record.

As the most widespread flood event there since Tropical Storm Allison in 2001, it caused a state of emergency to be declared in nine counties.



Meteorological history 

In mid-April 2016, a large, slow-moving upper-level low emerged from the Four Corners region in Rocky Mountains over the Central United States. Simultaneously, a ridge became anchored over the Eastern United States with another low to the east, creating an omega block—a stagnant weather pattern. The low near the Rockies pulled large quantities of moisture north from the Gulf of Mexico, leading to both heavy snow in the mountains and widespread heavy rain to the plains. During the overnight hours of April 15–18, a nearly stationary mesoscale convective system developed over the Houston Metropolitan Area. At 4:39 a.m. CDT, a flash flood emergency was declared for parts of Colorado, Waller, Grimes, Montgomery, Harris, and Austin counties, later expanding to Fort Bend.

Accumulations peaked at  along Little Mound Creek at Mathis Road to the northwest of Houston. This marked the wettest April on record for Houston.

At the same time, the upper low produced a major snowstorm in the Rocky Mountains and High Plains from April 16–17. Due to the omega block, snowfall remained concentrated around the Denver metropolitan areas. This definitely led to areas coming close to breaking their top-snowiest days in April. A climate study analyzing the 2015 flood in Texas and Oklahoma has found an intensified El Niño effect on the climatologically wet season of spring, and the intensification has a trace of anthropogenic climate warming.

The upper low began to move eastward on April 19, as the omega block began to break down. It was expected to reach the East Coast by April 22, with much less rainfall totals as it began to accelerate.

Impact
Over 47,000 customers lost power in Colorado, and to the west of Denver, portions of Interstate 70 closed. In addition, portions of Interstate 80 closed in southeastern Wyoming. The torrential rains resulted in widespread, severe flooding across Houston and surrounding suburbs—the worst since Tropical Storm Allison in 2001. 5 people died in flood-related incidents. In Harris County alone, more than 1,800 high water rescues were conducted; 744 homes and 400 apartments were inundated with water. School districts across the county suspended activities for two days to three days. Immediately after the storm, property damage was estimated at $5 billion.

References 

2016 floods in the United States
2016 in Texas
Floods in Texas
History of Houston
2016 meteorology
April 2016 events in the United States
Natural disasters in Colorado